The UK Rock & Metal Albums Chart is a record chart which ranks the best-selling rock and heavy metal albums in the United Kingdom. Compiled and published by the Official Charts Company, the data is based on each album's weekly physical sales, digital downloads and streams. In 2018 to date, 20 albums have topped the 25 published charts. The first (and to date most successful) number one of the year was Concrete and Gold, the ninth studio album by American alternative rock band Foo Fighters, which spent the first three weeks of the year atop the chart.

Chart history

See also
List of UK Rock & Metal Singles Chart number ones of 2018

References

External links
Official UK Rock & Metal Albums Chart Top 40 at the Official Charts Company
The Official UK Top 40 Rock Albums at BBC Radio 1

2018 in British music
United Kingdom Rock and Metal Albums
2018